Adrian Marius Stoian (born 11 February 1991) is a Romanian professional footballer who plays as a midfielder. He is noted for his versatility.

Club career
Stoian started his career at Gheorghe Popescu's football school, which he joined in 2006.

Roma
In 2009, he joined Serie A team A.S. Roma. He made his Serie A debut on 21 March 2009 against Juventus F.C. as a substitute for Mirko Vučinić in the last minutes of the game.

Stoian spent the 2010–11 season on loan at Pescara, but he did not manage to impress due to an injury that sidelined him for good part of the year.

Loan to Bari
On 5 August 2011, Stoian joined A.S. Bari on a season-long loan deal that bring teammates Alessandro Crescenzi and Simone Sini to the team too. In order to formalize the deal, Stoian also signed a new three-year contract with €86,700 annual gross wage.

In December, Stoian had a great game against Brescia, when he scored two goals in a 3–1 victory. On 14 January 2012, he closed the scoring in the 2–0 victory against A.S. Varese. On 11 March, Stoian brought his team the victory, with a last minute goal against Reggina Calcio. He finished an impressive 2011–12 season scoring five goals from 31 games for Bari.

On 22 June 2012, A.S. Bari activated a buy-out clause in his contract for €300K in co-ownership deal and Stoian signed for them. A week later, Roma bought him back from Bari for a fee of €1 million.

Chievo

In the summer of 2012, after an excellent season in Serie B, Stoian joined Chievo Verona in another co-ownership deal for €500,000, in a deal that involved Chievo midfielder Michael Bradley going the other way.

His first goal in Serie A came on 31 October later that year, in a 2–0 home win against Pescara. It was also the first goal of Stoian for his new club. In January 2015 Stoian was signed by Serie B club F.C. Crotone in a temporary deal.

In June 2015 Chievo acquired Stoian for free. Stoian's contract was canceled in a mutual consent on 21 August.

Crotone
On 25 August 2015, Stoian was signed by Crotone on a free transfer. He signed a three-year deal.

Livorno
On 19 August 2019, he signed with Serie B club Livorno.

Ascoli
On 12 January 2021 he returned to Italy and signed with Ascoli.

International career
Stoian made his international debut against Trinidad & Tobago, playing the last ten minutes of a friendly game on 4 June 2013.

Career statistics

Club

International

References

External links
 
 

1991 births
Living people
Sportspeople from Craiova
Romanian footballers
Romania youth international footballers
Romania under-21 international footballers
Romania international footballers
Association football midfielders
Serie A players
Serie B players
Liga I players
A.S. Roma players
S.S.C. Bari players
Delfino Pescara 1936 players
A.C. ChievoVerona players
Genoa C.F.C. players
F.C. Crotone players
U.S. Livorno 1915 players
FC Steaua București players
FC Viitorul Constanța players
Ascoli Calcio 1898 F.C. players
Romanian expatriate footballers
Expatriate footballers in Italy
Romanian expatriate sportspeople in Italy